Samuel Bradburn (1751–1816), was a Methodist preacher. He was an associate of John Wesley, and an intimate disciple of Fletcher of Madeley.

He was the son of a private in the army, and was born at Gibraltar.

On his father's return to England, when he was about twelve years old, he was apprenticed to a cobbler at Chester, and after a course of youthful profligacy became a Methodist at the age of eighteen. Bradburn entered the itinerant ministry about three years later in 1774, and continued in it more than forty years till his death.

Bradburn was, according to the testimony of all who heard him, an extraordinary natural orator. He had a commanding figure, though he grew corpulent early in life, a remarkably easy carriage, and a voice and intonation of wonderful power and beauty. By assiduous study he became perhaps the greatest preacher of his day, and was able constantly to sway and fascinate vast masses of the people. His natural powers manifested themselves from the first time that he was called upon to speak in public. On that occasion he was suddenly impelled to take the place of an absent preacher, and spoke for an hour without hesitation, though for months previously he had been trembling at the thought of such an ordeal. In the evening of the same day a large concourse came together to hear him again, when he preached for three hours, and found, at the same moment in which he exercised the powers, that he had obtained the fame of an orator.

Bradburn was a man of great simplicity, generosity, and eccentricity. Of this once famous preacher nothing remains but a volume of a few posthumous sermons.

Bradburn was president of the Methodist conference in 1799. He died on 26 July 1816.

References

1751 births
1816 deaths
18th-century English people
19th-century English people
Gibraltarians
English Methodist ministers
Presidents of the Methodist Conference
18th-century Gibraltarian people
19th-century Gibraltarian people